The Roman Catholic Archdiocese of Songea is the Metropolitan See for the Ecclesiastical province of Songea in Tanzania.

History
 12 November 1913: Established as Apostolic Prefecture of Lindi from the Apostolic Vicariate of Dar-es-Salaam
 15 December 1927: Promoted as Diocese of Lindi
 23 December 1931: Demoted as Territorial Abbacy of Peramiho
 6 February 1969: Promoted as Diocese of Songea

Special churches
The seat of the archbishop is at the St. Mathias Mulumba Kalemba Metropolitan Cathedral in Songea.

Bishops

Ordinaries
 Prefects Apostolic of Lindi (Latin Church) 
Willibrord Lay (1913–1922)
 Territorial Abbots of Peramiho (Roman rite) 
Gallus Steiger (22 February 1922 – 6 December 1952)
Eberhard Spiess (9 September 1953 – 6 February 1969)
Emmanuel Mapunda (8 August 1965 – 6 February 1986)
 Bishop of Songea (Latin Church) 
 James Joseph Komba (6 February 1969 – 18 November 1987)
 Metropolitan Archbishops of Songea (Latin Church)
James Joseph Komba (18 November 1987 – 1 February 1992)
Norbert Wendelin Mtega (6 July 1992 – 15 May 2013)
Damian Denis Dallu (14 March 2014 –)

Auxiliary bishop
James Joseph Komba (1961–1969), appointed Bishop here

Other priest of this diocese who became bishop
Emmanuel A. Mapunda, appointed Bishop of Mbinga in 1986

Suffragan dioceses
 Lindi
 Mbinga
 Mtwara
 Njombe
 Tunduru–Masasi

See also
Roman Catholicism in Tanzania

Sources
 GCatholic.org
 Archdiocese of Songea website 
 Catholic Hierarchy

Songea
 
 
Songea